Álvaro Barreto (1 January 1936 – 10 February 2020) was a Portuguese politician and engineer, and a member of the Social Democratic Party. From 1978 to 2005, he occupied various government ministry offices.

Biography
Barreto obtained his license in civil engineering from Instituto Superior Técnico in 1959. He then served as a project manager for Profabril until 1969, when he became an administrative director for the Lisbon shipyards.

On 22 November 1978, Barreto was appointed as Minister of Industry and Technology by Carlos Mota Pinto. However, once the Pinto government fell in 1979, Barreto left politics and joined the board of directors of TAP Air Portugal. However, he returned to government in 1980 when Francisco de Sá Carneiro formed a coalition cabinet and Barreto became Minister of Industry and Energy. The following year, after Carneiro's death, Barreto became Minister of European Integration. However, this position was abolished on 4 September 1981.

Barreto became Minister of Commerce and Tourism on 9 June 1983 after having been appointed by his ruling Social Democratic Party (PSD). After a cabinet reshuffle, he became Minister of Agriculture on 17 October 1983. He was the only member of the PSD to be elected in the Beja District in the 1985 elections, and became Minister of Agriculture, Fisheries, and Food on 6 November of that same year. He was re-elected to the Assembly of the Republic in 1987, again the only member of the PSD in Beja.

After a cabinet reshuffle on 5 January 1990, Barreto was relieved of his duties as Minister of Agriculture, Fisheries, and Food. He was elected in the Lisbon District in 1991 in the seventh position. He led the district's Committee on Foreign Affairs, Portuguese Communities and Cooperation. In 1995, he ran in the Castelo Branco District, earning the second position. In 1999, he moved back to Lisbon, winning the second position only behind PSD leader José Manuel Barroso.

In his last election in 2002, Barreto was elected to the third position in Lisbon. In this office, he chaired the Committee on Agriculture, Rural Development and Fisheries. On 17 July 2004, he was appointed Minister of Economic Activities and Labor. Barreto retired from politics following the 2005 elections, in which he did not run.

Álvaro Barreto died on 10 February 2020 at the age of 84.

References

20th-century Portuguese engineers
1936 births
2020 deaths
20th-century Portuguese politicians
21st-century Portuguese politicians
Social Democratic Party (Portugal) politicians
Government ministers of Portugal
Agriculture ministers of Portugal
Economy ministers of Portugal
Instituto Superior Técnico alumni
People from Lisbon
Portuguese people of Danish descent
Portuguese people of Italian descent